Alfons Adetuyi is a Canadian film and television director and producer. A partner in the film and television production firm Inner City Films with his brothers Tom, Amos and Robert, he is most noted as the director of the theatrical feature films High Chicago and Love Jacked.

He has also directed episodes of the television series Jozi-H and Skin Deep, the miniseries Ekhaya: A Family Chronicle, and the television drama film Survivors.

Originally from Sudbury, Ontario, he is an alumnus of the Canadian Film Centre.

References

External links

Canadian television directors
Film producers from Ontario
Canadian television producers
Black Canadian filmmakers
People from Greater Sudbury
Living people
Canadian Film Centre alumni
Film directors from Ontario
Canadian people of Nigerian descent
Year of birth missing (living people)